Ali Bolaghi (also Romanized as ‘Alī Bolāghī; also known as Ali-Bolag, Ali Bulagh, and ‘Ali Bulāq) is a village in Dizmar-e Sharqi Rural District, Minjavan District, Khoda Afarin County, East Azerbaijan Province, Iran. At the 2006 census, its population was 61, in 9 families.

References 

Populated places in Khoda Afarin County